The women's 400 metres event at the 2015 European Athletics U23 Championships was held in Tallinn, Estonia, at Kadriorg Stadium on 9 and 11 July.

Medalists

Results

Final
11 July

Heats
9 July

Heat 1

Heat 2

Heat 3

Participation
According to an unofficial count, 20 athletes from 14 countries participated in the event.

References

400 metres
400 metres at the European Athletics U23 Championships